Prosotas gracilis or The Dark-based Lineblue is a butterfly in the family Lycaenidae. It was described by Julius Röber in 1886. It is found in the Indomalayan realm.

Subspecies
Prosotas gracilis gracilis (Moluccas)
Prosotas gracilis donina (Snellen, 1901) (Java)
Prosotas gracilis ni (de Nicéville, 1902) (Sumatra, Java, Peninsular Malaysia)
Prosotas gracilis saturatior (Rothschild, 1915) (Vulcan Island)

References

External links
Prosatas at Markku Savela's Lepidoptera and Some Other Life Forms

Prosotas
Butterflies described in 1886